Urolaguna is a genus of moth in the family Lecithoceridae. It contains the species Urolaguna heosa, which is found in China (Jiangxi).

References

Natural History Museum Lepidoptera genus database

Lecithoceridae
Monotypic moth genera